The Copa Fraternidad 1972 was the second Central American club championship played between 12 clubs.

Teams

Group I

Standings

Group II

Standings

 Playoff for 1st place.

Final

Champion

External links
 RSSSF - Copa Fraternidad

1972
1
1971–72 in Costa Rican football
1971–72 in Salvadoran football
1971–72 in Guatemalan football